The 1960 United States Senate election in Arkansas took place on November 8, 1960. Incumbent Democratic U.S. Senator John L. McClellan was re-elected to a fourth term in office.

Because McClellan faced only token in the general election, his victory in the July 26 primary was tantamount to election. McClellan was also unopposed in the primary.

Democratic primary
The Democratic primary election was held on July 26, 1960.

Candidates
John L. McClellan, incumbent U.S. Senator

Results

General election

Results

References

Bibliography
 
 

1960
Arkansas
United States Senate